Jordan Gate Towers (Arabic: أبراج بوابة الأردن), also known informally as 6th Circle Towers (Arabic: أبراج الدوار السادس), is a high class commercial and residential project currently under construction in Amman, Jordan, it consists of two high-rise buildings connected by a multi-storey podium.

Overview 

The total cost of the project is $300 million, was designed by late Palestinian-Jordanian architect Ja'afar Tuqan, owned by Jordan Gate Company, consulted by alnasser + partners, managed by ALNOUR Construction Management LLC,the contractor is Anas Anani & Partners Contracting Company, and the Aluminum & Glazing sub contractor is Turn Up AlFaisal Company.

The North Tower, will host residential apartments, while the South Tower will host a 200-room hotel, residential apartments, and offices. 

The multi-storey podium will host a shopping mall with 70 brands, swimming pools, conference halls and restaurants. 

In addition, there are five underground parking storeys, that have a capacity for 1550 passenger vehicles.

History 
The area of land where the project now stands, used to be a private property, and was sold to Greater Amman Municipality in 1959, for the purpose of turning it into a public park. In 1978, part of the land, was designated for investment, which in 1984, became a hotel named Amrah (Arabic: عمرة) (now Crowne Plaza Amman), along with a water tower.  

In 2004, the park, was sold to Bahrain's GFH Financial Group, and on May 29, 2005, King Abdullah II laid the foundation stone for the Jordan Gate Project. In 2008, glazing works started, and the towers topped-out at the end of the year. In 2009 and 2010, construction was slow and intermittent; mainly due to financial hardship between the contractor and the owner following the financial crisis of 2007–2008, and also due to the northern tower's crane collapse that stalled works for several months.

In 2011, the financial hardship caused construction to halt at 70%. The site was abandonded for many years, and the buildings have undergone weathering and corrosion. In May 2016, after many failed negotiations, the conflict between the owner and the contractor had approached a settlement, that nonetheless didn't last for long. In mid-2017, construction works resumed for some time, which mainly focused on facade cleaning, tower crane replacing, and installing a steel structure on roof for glazing. 

In February 2022, Greater Amman Municipality entered as a partner, by acquiring 31% (amounts for 50 million Jordanian Dinars) of the capital of the Jordan Gate Company that owns the project. The bid referral for the first package of works related to the implementation of the external façade for the buildings took place in December 2022.

Finally, in January 2023, construction was put back on track, and will be completed by December 2024.

Construction Resumption 
According to Greater Amman Municipality strategic plan for the years 2022-2026, there are three construction phases to complete the Jordan Gate Towers project, stretching from December 2022 till December 2024, as follows:
From January till September of 2023, implementing external facade works.
 From mid-2023 till December 2024, interior design works, internal slicing, and electromechanical works required to transform the North Tower from an office tower according to the original design into a residential tower consisting of luxury apartments with distinctive specifications, as well as the mall.
 Completion works of the South Tower, starting not later than March of 2023, after signing a contract with a hotel company, and then the timetable for implementation will be prepared.

Accidents 
There were three major accidents during the project's construction from 2006 to 2009:

Fire 
A fire broke out on the eighth storey of the north tower in August 2006, but nobody was injured.

Storeys Collapse 
In September 2006, just three weeks after the fire, three storeys of the north tower collapsed, killing four workers and injuring 15 others.

Tower Crane Collapse 
In May 2009, a part of the crane on the north tower collapsed after it was overloaded. There were no injuries, but an Egyptian worker suffered from shock and was transported to a nearby hospital. For three days following the collapse, families living near the site were evacuated to nearby hotels. The dismantling and removal of the broken crane began on Friday, June 12th, 2009. Four additional cranes were bought to assist in the dismantling process. Within a few months, the crane had been replaced with a new one and work was able to resume.

Criticism 
The project has been subjected to a lot of criticism since even before its construction, mainly due to:

 Its conflict with the skyline of Amman.

 Noise pollution that comes from construction works around the clock.

 Revealing many surrounding houses and the lack of privacy.
 Reflection of sunlight from the glazing.

 The weak surrounding infrastructure such as electrical, water supply, and wastewater networks. Moreover, traffic congestion is on top of all concerns, especially that the neighbourhood is already crowded.

See also 
 List of tallest buildings in Amman
 List of twin buildings and structures

References

Buildings and structures in Amman
Buildings and structures under construction in Jordan
Twin towers
Skyscrapers in Amman
Tourist attractions in Amman
Proposed skyscrapers
Skyscraper hotels
Residential skyscrapers